Haborofutamata Dam  is an earthfill dam located in Hokkaido Prefecture in Japan. The dam is used for irrigation. The catchment area of the dam is 25.8 km2. The dam impounds about 36  ha of land when full and can store 4300 thousand cubic meters of water. The construction of the dam was started on 1967 and completed in 1978.

References

Dams in Hokkaido